Harald Einar Rød (April 5, 1897 – July 21, 1931) was a Norwegian actor.

Rød made his theater debut in 1915. Starting in 1924, Rød was at the National Theater in Oslo, where he played major roles in plays such as Outward Bound (Norwegian title: Til fremmed havn) by Sutton Vane and Maria Stuart by Friedrich Schiller. He also appeared in some Swedish silent films and showed great talent for the medium, among other things in the role of the new priest in Prästänkan by Carl Theodor Dreyer (1920).

Einar Rød was married to the Swedish actress Mary Johnson, and among other productions they both starred in the German film Die Stimme des Herzens, directed by Hanns Schwarz.

Theater roles (selected)
1920: Maurice in My Father Was Right (Swedish title: Min far hade rätt) by Sacha Guitry (Intimate Theater, directed by Einar Fröberg)
1920: Sergei in Professor Storitzyn by Leonid Andreyev (Intimate Theater, directed by Einar Fröberg)
1921: He in Nju by Osip Dymov (Intimate Theater, directed by Rune Carlsten)
1921: Vasanta in Chitra by Rabindranath Tagore (Intimate Theater, directed by Einar Fröberg)

Filmography
1919: Synnöve Solbakken as Aslak, a farmhand at the Granliden farm
1920: Prästänkan as Söfren
1920: Robinson i skärgården as the newlywed
1924: Die Stimme des Herzens as Dr. Axel Wyborg

References

External links
 
 Einar Rød at Sceneweb
 EinarRød at Filmfront
 Einar Rød at the National Theater
 Einar Rød at the Swedish Film Database

1897 births
1931 deaths
20th-century Norwegian male actors
People from Halden